David Nelson (born August 6, 1941) is a Republican politician from the U.S. state of Oregon. He served four terms in the Oregon State Senate. He lives in Pendleton, and represented District 29.

Birth
David Nelson was born in Pendleton, Oregon, United States.

Family
Nelson and his wife Alice have four children. They also have four grandchildren.

Politics
He was first elected to the Senate in 1996, and reelected in 2000, 2004, and 2008.

Political experience
David Nelson has had the following experience:
Senator, Oregon State Senate, 1996–2013
Oregon State Senate Majority Leader, 2001
County Attorney, Pondera County, Montana, 1971-1975

Organizations
David Nelson has been a member of the following organizations:
Member, American Bar Association
Member, Babe Ruth Association
Member, Eastern Oregon Symphony
Member, Education Foundation of Pendleton
Member, Oregon Wheat League
Member, Pendleton Swim Association
Member, Rotary Club

Education
He attended the University of California at Berkeley, but then transferred to the University of Oregon, where he earned a bachelor's degree in Political Science in 1964. He then managed, and later purchased, a wheat farm in Brady, Montana. He earned a law degree from the University of Montana Law School in 1967.

References

External links
Official web page, Oregon State Senate

Living people
Republican Party Oregon state senators
Politicians from Pendleton, Oregon
University of Oregon alumni
University of Montana alumni
1941 births
University of California, Berkeley alumni
21st-century American politicians